Moolman is an Afrikaans surname. Notable people with the surname include:

Ashleigh Moolman (born 1985), South African cyclist
Bradley Moolman (born 1991), South African rugby union player
Kobus Moolman, South African poet
Louis Moolman (1951–2006), South African rugby union player
Morné Moolman (born 1994), South African javelin thrower
Whestley Moolman (born 1990), South African rugby union player
Darryl Luke Moolman (born 1990), South African Accountant

Afrikaans-language surnames